The 2007 World Rally Championship was the 35th season in the FIA World Rally Championship. The season began on 19 January, with the Monte Carlo Rally and ended on 2 December, with the Wales Rally GB. Citroën's Sébastien Loeb won his fourth consecutive drivers' world championship ahead of Ford's Marcus Grönholm and Mikko Hirvonen. Ford took the manufacturers' title.



Regulation changes 

Remote service was introduced. Between two sets of stages, instead of returning to the main service location, cars are serviced in a remote location. The service duration is 15 minutes, only four mechanics are allowed and the only parts which can be changed (save for tires) are the ones carried in the car itself.

Since 2006 manufacturer is understood to mean a manufacturer, a team designated by a manufacturer, or a privateer team taking part with a single make of car. In 2007 two categories were created to compete for the Manufacturer's championship, replacing the previous M1 and M2 categories:

Manufacturer (M)
undertakes to take part in all the rallies of the Championship
must enter only cars corresponding to the latest homologated version of a World Rally Car in conformity with the 2007 Appendix J
must inform the FIA of the name of the first driver entered for the season at the time of registration for the Championship. No change of the first driver is authorised, except in a case of force majeure. The driver of the second car may be changed for each of the rallies in the Championship
In order to score points in the Championship, a Manufacturer must take part with two cars of the same make in all the rallies of the calendar

Manufacturer Team (MT)
undertakes to take part in 10 or more Championship rallies which it has nominated
cannot enter World Rally Cars homologated during the year 2007 and cannot use parts homologated after 2 January 2007
In order to score points in the Championship, a Manufacturer Team must take part with two cars of the same make in 10 or more rallies it nominated on registering for the Championship. The Manufacturer Team can only score points in the events it nominated on registering

Calendar 

The 2007 championship was contested over sixteen rounds in Europe, North America, Asia, South America and Oceania.

Teams and drivers

 – indicates a car running with varying numbers during the season

P-WRC Entries

JWRC entries

Events

Results

Statistics

Season results summary

Drivers' championship

 Sébastien Loeb secured the drivers' championship title in Wales.

Manufacturers' championship

 Ford secured the manufacturers' championship in Ireland.

PWRC

JWRC Drivers' championship

References

External links

 FIA World Rally Championship 2007 at ewrc-results.com
Season 2007 at World Rally Archive

World Rally Championship seasons
World Rally Championship